Tolkien's Legendarium: Essays on The History of Middle-earth is a collection of scholarly essays edited by Verlyn Flieger and Carl F. Hostetter on the 12 volumes of The History of Middle-earth, relating to J. R. R. Tolkien's fiction and compiled and edited by his son, Christopher. It was published by Greenwood Press in 2000. That series comprises a substantial part of "Tolkien's legendarium", the body of Tolkien's mythopoeic writing that forms the background to his The Lord of the Rings and which Christopher Tolkien summarized in his compilation of The Silmarillion.

It includes a bibliography of works by Christopher Tolkien compiled by Douglas A. Anderson.

Tolkien's Legendarium won the 2002 Mythopoeic Scholarship Award for Inklings Studies.

Contents

 The history
 Rayner Unwin — Early Days of Elder Days
 Christina Scull — The Development of Tolkien's Legendarium: Some Threads in the Tapestry of Middle-earth
 Wayne G. Hammond — 'A Continuing and Evolving Creation': Distractions in the Later History of Middle-earth
 Charles Noad — On the Construction of The Silmarillion
 David Bratman — The Literary Value of The History of Middle-earth

 The languages
 Christopher Gilson — Gnomish is Sindarin: The Conceptual Evolution of an Elvish Language
 Arden R. Smith — Certhas, Skirditaila, Futhark: A Feigned History of Runic Origins
 Patrick Wynne and Carl F. Hostetter — Three Elvish Verse Modes: Ann-thennath, Minlamad thent / estent, and Linnod

 The cauldron and the cook
 Joe R. Christopher — Tolkien's Lyric Poetry
 Paul Edmund Thomas — Some of Tolkien's Narrators
 Verlyn Flieger — The Footsteps of Ælfwine
 John D. Rateliff — The Lost Road, The Dark Tower, and The Notion Club Papers: Tolkien and Lewis's Time Travel Triad
 Marjorie Burns — Gandalf and Odin
 Richard C. West — Túrin's Ofermod: An Old English Theme in the Development of the Story of Túrin

 Appendix
 Douglas A. Anderson — Christopher Tolkien: A Bibliography

Reception 

John S. Ryan, reviewing the book for VII, called it a "luminous companion" to the 12 volumes of The History of Middle-earth, and "clearly indispensable". Ryan stated that it "pays a much merited tribute" to Christopher Tolkien's six decades or more of work on his father's writings, indeed from his childhood as one of the original audience for The Hobbit. Ryan describes the 14 essays as "carefully argued", noting among other things Bratman's description of the 4 styles Tolkien used in the Legendarium as "Annalistic, Antique, Appendical, and Philosophical".

References

External links
 Tolkien's Legendarium

Books about Middle-earth
2000 non-fiction books